A moon dog (or moondog) or mock moon, also called a paraselene (plural paraselenae) in meteorology, is an atmospheric optical phenomenon that consists of a bright spot to one or both sides of the Moon. They are exactly analogous to sun dogs.

Moon dogs are caused by the refraction of moonlight by hexagonal-plate-shaped ice crystals in cirrus or cirrostratus clouds. They typically appear as a pair of faint patches of light, at around 22° to the left and right of the Moon, and at the same altitude above the horizon as the Moon. They may also appear alongside 22° halos.

Moon dogs are rarer than sun dogs because the Moon must be bright, about quarter moon or more, for the moon dogs to be observed. Moon dogs show little color to the unaided human eye because their light is not bright enough to activate the eye's cone cells.

See also
 Halo (optical phenomenon)
 Circumhorizontal arc
 Circumzenithal arc
 Gegenschein
 Zodiacal light

References

Atmospheric optical phenomena